Pearcea intermedia is a threatened species from Ecuador.

References

intermedia
Flora of Ecuador
Endangered plants